This is a list of notable events in music that took place in the year 2000. This year was the peak of CD sales in the United States, with sales declining year on year since then.

Specific locations
2000 in British music
2000 in Norwegian music
2000 in South Korean music

Specific genres
2000 in classical music
2000 in country music
2000 in heavy metal music
2000 in hip hop music
2000 in Latin music
2000 in jazz

Events

January
 January 1
In New York City, United States, at precisely midnight, Prince celebrates the start of the final year before the new millennium by playing his anthemic "1999", in what he vows is the song's finale.
British composer John Tavener is knighted in the New Year's Honours List.
January 11
Gary Glitter is released from jail, two months before his sentence for downloading 4000 pornographic images of children ends.
Sharon Osbourne quits as manager of Smashing Pumpkins after only three months. In a brash press release she announces she had to resign "for medical reasons: Billy Corgan was making me sick."
Singer Whitney Houston is caught with 15.2 grams of marijuana in her bag at a Hawaii airport. She boards her flight to San Francisco before police can arrive to arrest her.
January 14 – Rolling Stone reveals that the two children of Melissa Etheridge and her partner, Julie Cypher, were fathered by David Crosby.
January 18 – Spencer Goodman is executed by lethal injection in Huntsville, Texas, for the 1991 kidnap and murder of the wife of ZZ Top manager Bill Ham. Ham is present at the execution.
January 21–February 6 – The Big Day Out festival takes place in Australia and New Zealand, headlined by Red Hot Chili Peppers and Nine Inch Nails. Mr. Bungle are originally named in the lineup, but are "kicked off" due to an ongoing dispute with the Red Hot Chili Peppers.

February
February 9 – The Million Dollar Hotel, a film co-written by U2 lead singer Bono, premieres at the 50th Berlinale (Berlin International Film Festival).
February 11 – Diana Ross divorces Arne Næss Jr., her husband of 14 years.
February 16 – The Silver Tassie, an opera by Mark-Anthony Turnage, receives its première at the London Coliseum, performed by the English National Opera.
February 23 – At the 42nd Annual Grammy Awards, Santana win a record 8 Grammys in one night, tying Michael Jackson who won 8 in 1984. Among the awards won are Album of the Year for Supernatural and Record of the Year and Song of the Year, both for "Smooth" featuring Matchbox Twenty frontman Rob Thomas. Christina Aguilera won Best New Artist.
February 24 – Italian motorcycle manufacturing company Aprilia wins a lawsuit filed against the Spice Girls over a sponsorship deal that fell apart when Geri Halliwell left the group.

March
March 6 – Foxy Brown is injured in a car accident in Brooklyn, New York, in which her car hit a fence. Police discover that Brown was driving with a suspended driver license and order her to appear in court in April. Brown's license was suspended for failing to appear in court for a parking violation.
March 7 – heavy metal band Disturbed release their debut studio album The Sickness.
March 11 – 311 holds their first 3–11 Day concert at Tower Records in the French Quarter of New Orleans.
March 13 – Blink-182 end their European tour early after guitarist/vocalist Tom DeLonge and drummer Travis Barker succumb to strep throat.
March 21 – NSYNC rises to superstardom after the fast-paced sales of their second studio album No Strings Attached
March 24 – After violating a prior probation agreement by getting drunk, Ol' Dirty Bastard is ordered to undergo a 90-day diagnostic evaluation at the California Institute For Men in Chino, California.

April
April 1 – Ted Nugent angers Hispanic groups in Texas after onstage remarks he makes during a concert at the Cynthia Woods Mitchell Pavilion, in which he says that those who did not speak English should get out of America. He is banned from the venue as a result.
April 4 – Mick Jagger attends the opening of an arts center named after him at Dartford Grammar School in southeast England.
April 6 – Shawn Colvin, James Taylor, Cyndi Lauper, Richard Thompson, Sweet Honey in the Rock, Elton John, Cassandra Wilson, Wynonna Judd, k.d. lang, Bryan Adams, and Mary Chapin Carpenter perform in New York as part of a tribute to Joni Mitchell.
April 12 – Metallica files a lawsuit against the peer-to-peer service Napster, as well as Yale University, University of Southern California and Indiana University for copyright infringement. Yale and Indiana are later dropped from the suit when they block access to Napster on campus computers.
 April 25 – Nu Metal band Papa Roach releases their second studio album, Infest

May
May 1 – A $1.8 million civil fraud lawsuit is filed against Neil Young in Los Angeles Superior Court by a former Village Voice writer. The lawsuit charges that Young broke an agreement to have a biography written about him when he blocked the book's publication.
May 3 – 75-year-old tenor Carlo Bergonzi makes his final professional appearance at Carnegie Hall, in a concert performance of Otello. After two acts, he is replaced by an understudy.
May 4 – Letters To Cleo play their last concert in Boston; they disband the following month.
May 5 – Rod Stewart undergoes an hour-long throat operation at Cedars-Sinai Medical Center in Los Angeles to remove a growth on his thyroid, which turns out to be benign.
May 6 – John Mellencamp receives an honorary Doctor of Music degree as the commencement speaker for Indiana University's Class of 2000.
May 7 – Westlife releases their 2000 debut album with the release of their Billboard #1 hit single "Swear It Again", as the group's first and only single to have charted in the US
May 13
The 45th Eurovision Song Contest final, held in Stockholm's Globe Arena, is won by Denmark's Olsen Brothers and the song "Fly on the Wings of Love".
Dickey Betts is kicked out of The Allman Brothers Band and replaced with Warren Haynes.
May 16 – Prince announces that he has changed his name back to Prince now that his publishing contract with Warner/Chappell has expired. He had been known as an unpronounceable symbol, since 1993.
May 23 – Eminem releases his third studio album The Marshall Mathers LP selling over 1.76 million copies in its first week, and becomes the fastest selling hip-hop album ever in first week sales.
May 24 – 50 Cent is shot nine times in Queens. After spending time in hospital he returns to recording and performing.
May 25 – Eddie Van Halen begins treatment for prevention of tongue cancer at the University of Texas MD Anderson Cancer Center in Houston, Texas.
May 29 – Michael Jackson and Mariah Carey are named the Best Selling Male and Female artist of the millennium at the World Music Awards in Monaco.

June
June 8 – Sinéad O'Connor comes out as a lesbian in an interview with Curve magazine.
June 17 – Aaliyah's "Try Again" reaches number one on the Billboard Hot 100. It becomes the first airplay song in history to reach number one following new chart rules placed in 1998 that allowed airplay singles to chart for the first time.
June 20 – Britney Spears begins her Oops!... I Did It Again World Tour, her first world tour, visiting North America, Europe and Brazil in support her sophomore album, Oops!... I Did It Again. The tour was a commercial success and became the second highest-grossing tour by a solo artist in 2000, only behind Tina Turner's Twenty Four Seven retirement tour.
June 23–25 – The Experience Music Project, now the Museum of Pop Culture, opens in Seattle.
June 30 – Nine people are crushed to death during Pearl Jam's set at the Roskilde Festival, in Roskilde, Denmark.

July–August
July 21–22 – Oasis plays at Wembley Stadium. The first of this night is featured on the double CD and the DVD Familiar to Millions.
July 26 – A U.S. district judge orders the Napster to halt the trading of copyrighted music among its users, essentially ordering it shut down. A stay on the injunction is granted two days later, allowing the site to continue operating for the time being.
August 1 – Experimental pop band Animal Collective release their debut album Spirit They're Gone, Spirit They've Vanished under the name Avey Tare & Panda Bear.
August 8 – A coalition of 28 U.S. states file a lawsuit against the major record labels, accusing them of keeping the prices of CDs fixed at artificially high prices since 1995.
August 11 – Madonna gives birth to her second child, son Rocco. Film director Guy Ritchie is the father.
August 14 – Outside the Democratic National Convention in Los Angeles, Rage Against the Machine performs a free concert protesting the two-party system. In a chaotic scene after the performance, police forcibly disperse the crowd and several arrests are made.
August 16 – Rapper Eminem files for divorce from wife Kim Mathers.
August 20 – Skinny Puppy reunite for a concert at the Doomsday Festival in Dresden, Germany.
August 22 – Nu Metal band Mudvayne Released their debut studio album L.D. 50 (album)

September
September 7 – Rage Against the Machine's Tim Commerford is arrested for climbing on the set at MTV's Video Music Awards after his band lost the award for "Best Rock Video" to Limp Bizkit. The director of Rage's "Sleep Now in the Fire" video, Michael Moore, suggests Commerford was probably "just bored" by the show. NSYNC performed their hit single "Bye Bye Bye".
September 11- Successful British girl group Sugababes release their debut single 'Overload'.
September 13 – The first Latin Grammy Awards are held.
September 23 – Isaac Stern celebrates his 80th birthday together with his 40th anniversary as President of Carnegie Hall.
September 26 – Pearl Jam releases twenty-five live albums, each taken from a different show on their European tour, as the initial part of the Pearl Jam Official Bootlegs series.

October
October 1 – Midnight Oil perform their single "Beds are Burning" at the closing of the 2000 Summer Olympics dressed in outfits clearly displaying the word "Sorry" in reference to Australian Prime Minister John Howard's refusal to apologise to the Stolen Generation.
October 2 – Radiohead release their fourth studio album, Kid A. While highly anticipated in the leadup to its release, the album is met with polarized responses from fans and critics as a result of its shift from the densely-layered alternative rock of its 1997 predecessor in favor of electronica-tinged post-rock. However, its reputation would grow more unanimously positive over the years, eventually being regarded by music analysts as one of the greatest albums of all time.
October 3 – Green Day release their sixth album Warning. Despite positive reviews from critics, it would end up a commercial disappointment compared to their previous efforts.
October 5
 The Beatles release a hardcover book version of The Beatles Anthology, containing newly published photos and interviews with band members. The book went straight to the top of the New York Times Bestseller List.
EMI and Warner Music Group withdraw their application to the European Commission for a proposed $20 billion merger due to regulators' concerns. The merger would have concentrated 80% of the European music business into the hands of just four major labels.
October 18 – Zack de la Rocha leaves Rage Against the Machine saying that the band's decision-making process has completely failed.
October 24 – Linkin Park release their debut album Hybrid Theory. It has reached diamond certification by the RIAA, with 11 million units as of 2017, making it the best-selling rock album of the 21st century.
October 31 – Napster and BMG Music announce a partnership that would change the website into a subscription-based service offering legal downloads.

November–December
November 5 – The fourth Terrastock festival is held in Seattle.
November 18 – A new musical adaptation of Georg Büchner's Woyzeck by Robert Wilson and Tom Waits opens in Copenhagen.
November 21 - The Backstreet Boys experience back-to-back sales after the release of their 4th/3rd album Black & Blue
December 2
Tripp Eisen formerly of Dope replaces Koichi Fukuda in Static-X.
The Smashing Pumpkins played what was to be their final concert at the Metro Club in Chicago. The band would reunite in 2005.
December 22
Madonna marries film director Guy Ritchie, at Skibo Castle in Dornoch, Sutherland, Scotland with Gwyneth Paltrow, Stella McCartney, Sting, George Clooney, Jon Bon Jovi, Celine Dion, Bryan Adams, Rupert Everett and others in attendance.
The Coen brothers film, O Brother, Where Art Thou? is released, scored by a T-Bone Burnett-produced soundtrack that revives the popularity of traditional American folk music and bluegrass.
December 31 – Chris Robinson of The Black Crowes marries actress Kate Hudson.

Bands formed
See Musical groups established in 2000

Bands disbanded
All Saints (reformed in 2006)
Art of Noise
Atari Teenage Riot (reformed in 2010)
B*Witched (reformed 2013)
Ben Folds Five (reformed in 2011)
Color Me Badd
Pezz (legal issue with band name, changed name to Billy Talent)
Candlebox (reformed in 2006)
Demonoid
Drain STH
Genesis (would sporadically reunite for reunion tours in 2006 and 2020)
The Golden Palominos
Hi-Standard
Hum
Jack Off Jill
June of 44
Kid Dynamite
Knapsack
Lifter Puller
Luna Sea
Luscious Jackson
Make-Up
The Paradise Motel (reform in 2007)
Phish (hiatus until 2002, disband in 2004)
The Posies (reformed in 2004)
Primus (hiatus until 2004)
Pure
Rage Against the Machine (reformed in 2007)
Sacred Reich (reformed in 2007)
Screaming Trees
Seaweed (reformed in 2007)
Skunk Anansie (reformed 2009)
The Smashing Pumpkins (reformed in 2006)
Soul Coughing
Spice Girls
Symposium
Urban Dance Squad

Bands reformed
The Presidents of the United States of America (after 1998 break)

Albums released

January–March

April–June

July–September

October–December

Release date unknown
 Cherry Kicks – Caesars
 Floodgate – MD Dunn
 Live in Chicago – Kurt Elling
 Marvin at the Movies – Hank Marvin
 Still Standing – Yellowcard

Biggest hit singles

The following songs achieved the highest chart positions
in the charts of 2000.

Popular songs

Best selling albums of the year in the United States (Soundscan)
According to Soundscan, the best selling album of 2000 was No Strings Attached by NSYNC, selling nearly 10 million copies.

Classical music
Thomas Adès – Piano Quintet, op. 20
John Coolidge Adams – El Niño (opera-oratorio)
John Luther Adams – The Light That Fills the World, for orchestra
Julian Anderson – Alhambra Suite, for chamber orchestra
Milton Babbitt
Little Goes a Long Way, for violin and piano
Pantuns, for soprano and piano
Leonardo Balada – Music for Flute and Orchestra
Chen Yi – KC Capriccio, for wind ensemble and mixed choir
Edward Cowie
Bad Lands Gold, for tuba and piano
Concerto for oboe and orchestra
Dark Matter, for brass ensemble
Elysium IV, for orchestra
Four Frames in a Row, for high voice and baroque ensemble
The Healing of Saul, for violin and harp (or piano)
Several Charms, for violin and piano
Peter Maxwell Davies – Symphony No. 7
Péter Eötvös – Paris–Dakar, for ensemble
Lorenzo Ferrero
Glamorama Spies, for flute, clarinet, violin, violoncello, and piano
Rastrelli in Saint Petersburg, for oboe and string orchestra
Tempi di quartetto, for string quartet
Stefano Gervasoni – Rigirio
Frans Geysen
Alles heeft zijn tijd 1, for orchestra
Alles heeft zijn tijd 2, for string quartet
Alles heeft zijn tijd 3, for string quartet
Alles heeft zijn tijd 4, for keyboard instrument
Alles heeft zijn tijd 5, for keyboard instrument
Alles heeft zijn tijd 6, for string quartet
Alles heeft zijn tijd 7, for four-part mixed choir (or string quartet, or trumpet, oboe, clarinet, and bassoon)
Alles heeft zijn tijd 8, for keyboard instrument
Alles heeft zijn tijd 9, for 4 trumpets
Alles komt terug 2, for three-part choir
Alles komt terug 3, for SSATB choir
Alles komt terug 4, for carillon
Alles komt terug 5, for keyboard instrument
Benadering van de kern, for keyboard instrument
Muziek voor toetsenbord 2, for piano
Toetsing, for keyboard instrument
Philip Glass
Tirol Concerto, for piano and orchestra
Concerto Fantasy, for two timpanists and orchestra
Alexander Goehr
Piano Quintet, op. 69
Suite, for two pianos, op. 70
Friedrich Goldmann –
Augenblick für Stimme, for mezzo-soprano, flute, oboe, clarinet, trombone, percussion, electric guitar, keyboard, viola and cello
Etudes (3) for piano
Quartet, for oboe, violin, viola, and cello
7 x 10 Takte für Dieter Schnebel, for flute and clarinet
Ilja Hurník
Con brio, for orchestra
Symphony in C
Karl Jenkins – Adiemus IV: The Eternal Knot
Nigel Keay – Viola Concerto
Wojciech Kilar –
Introitus for organ
Missa pro pace, for solo voices, choir and orchestra or instrumental ensemble
The Oscar fanfare
Meyer Kupferman – Icon Symphony
Mario Lavista
Estudio, for four marimbas
Mater dolorosa, for organ
Tres Miniaturas, for guitar,
György Ligeti – Síppal, dobbal, nádihegedűvel
Magnus Lindberg
Corrente – China Version
Jubilees, for piano
James MacMillan – Mass, for choir and organ
Mesías Maiguashca – El Tiempo, for 2 flutes, 2 clarinets, 2 cellos, 2 percussionists, and electronics
Tomás Marco – América (cantata)
Donald Martino – Romanza, for violin solo
Robert Morris
In Concert, for ten instruments
Still, for piano
Bayan Northcott – Alma Redemptoris Mater, for three tenors, op. 7, no. 2
Gérard Pape – Tantric Transformations, eight-channel electronic music and digital video
Henri Pousseur
Anneaux du soleil, for piano
Navigations, for harp
Seize Paysages planétaires, ethno-electroacoustical music
Wolfgang Rihm
Auf einem anderen Blatt, for piano
Concerto (Dithyrambe), for string quartet and orchestra
Deus passus (Passions-Stücke nach Lukas), for soprano, mezzo-soprano, alto, tenor, baritone, mixed chorus, and orchestra
... fleuve V (omnia tempus habent), for mezzo-soprano, baritone, distant ensemble (2 trumpets, 3 percussion), and large orchestra
Frage, for coloratura soprano, English horn, A-clarinet (+ bass clarinet), harp, viola, cello, double bass, piano, and percussion
Im Anfang, for large orchestra
In Frage, for English horn, bass clarinet, harp, viola, cello, double bass, piano, and percussion
Rilke: Vier Gedichte, for tenor and piano
Stilles Stück (text by Hermann Lenz), for baritone and 2 string quartets
Vers une symphonie fleuve IV, for large orchestra
Vier Male (Stücke), for A-clarinet
Peter Ruzicka – Traces, for clarinet and orchestra
Peter Sculthorpe
Djilile, for string quartet
From the River, for violin, viola, cello, double bass, and piano
Harbour Dreaming, for piano (originally titled Between Five Bells)
New Norcia, for brass and percussion
Parting, for viola and piano
Quamby, for chamber orchestra
Reef Singing, for clarinet and piano
Saibai, for unison voices and drums
Song for a Penny, for solo piano (shorter and longer versions)
Tailitnama Song, for viola and piano, or viola solo
Three Shakespeare Songs, for voice and piano (Text: William Shakespeare)
Roger Smalley – String Quartet No. 2
Juan María Solare
Blockartig, for three recorders (TTB)
Constelación (Nueva Suite Modal) [Constellation (New Modal Suite)], five pieces for flute and clarinet
de capa caída, tango for two pianos
Utopía caminante [Walking Utopia], for trombone and cello
Viejo Fueye Deconstruido [Old, deconstructed bag (bellows)], postmodern tango for tenor saxophone, bandoneon, double bass, and piano
Karlheinz Stockhausen
Engel-Prozessionen (from Sonntag aus Licht)
Refrain 2000
John Tavener – Song of the Cosmos
Eric Whitacre – October
Charles Wuorinen
Fourth String Quartet
Cyclops 2000, for twenty players

Opera
Michael Abels – Homies and Popz
John Coolidge Adams – El Niño (opera-oratorio)
Harrison Birtwistle – The Last Supper
Peter Maxwell Davies – Mr Emmet Takes a Walk
Carlisle Floyd – Cold Sassy Tree
Cristóbal Halffter – Don Quijote
Jake Heggie – Dead Man Walking
Michael Nyman – Facing Goya
Poul Ruders – The Handmaid's Tale
Kaija Saariaho – L'Amour de loin
Sheila Silver – The Thief of Love
Richard Thomas – Tourette's Diva

Jazz

Musical theater
Aida – Broadway production opened at the Palace Theatre and ran for 1852 performances
The Dead – Broadway production opened at the Belasco Theatre and ran for 120 performances
The Full Monty – Broadway production opened at the Eugene O'Neill Theatre and ran for 770 performances
Jane Eyre – Broadway production opened at the Brooks Atkinson Theatre and ran for 209 performances
The Music Man (Meredith Willson) – Broadway revival
Seussical – Broadway production opened at the Richard Rodgers Theatre and ran for 198 performances
The Sapphire Necklace – Midway Village premiere

Musical film
Almost Famous
Dancer in the Dark (Danser i mørket), starring Björk
Darling Darling
Escaflowne, with music by Yoko Kanno, Hajime Mizoguchi and Inon Zur
The Filth and the Fury
Help! I'm a Fish, with music by Søren Hyldgaard
Kandukondain Kandukondain
Nuvvu Vastavani
Songcatcher
The Road to El Dorado (animation)
The Tigger Movie released February 10
The Fantasticks released September 22, starring Joel Grey
Thenkasipattanam
Turn It Up

Births
January 1 - Ice Spice, American rapper
January 5
Big Baby Tape, Russian rapper, songwriter and record producer
Roxen, Romanian singer
January 6 – Shuhua, Taiwanese singer ((G)I-DLE)
January 8 – Noah Cyrus, American singer, songwriter, actress, activist (sister of Miley Cyrus and Trace Cyrus, and daughter of Billy Ray Cyrus)
January 9 – Flo Milli, American rapper and songwriter
January 10 - Reneé Rapp, American singer-songwriter and actress
January 18 – Rei(c)hi, Japanese rapper
January 20 – Mike Singer, German singer-songwriter
January 30 – Benee, New Zealand singer-songwriter and musician
February 9 – Mads Christian, Danish singer
 February 12 – María Becerra, Argentine singer 
February 16 – Koffee, Jamaican reggae singer, songwriter, rapper, DJ and guitarist
February 19 – Giorgos Kakosaios, Greek singer
February 27 – Tsuyoshi Furukawa, Japanese singer and actor (SUPER★DRAGON)
February 28 – Kyohei Takahashi, Japanese singer and actor (Naniwa Danshi)
March 5 – Gabby Barrett, American singer
March 10 – Roko Blažević, Croatian singer
March 15 – Kristian Kostov, Russian/Bulgarian singer-songwriter
March 20 – Hyunjin, South Korean singer and dancer (Stray Kids)
March 23 – Renjun, Chinese singer (NCT)
March 25 – Omer Fedi, Israeli guitarist, songwriter and producer (24kGoldn, Machine Gun Kelly, Iann Dior)
March 27 – Halle Bailey, American singer-songwriter, actress and member of duo Chloe x Halle
March 28 – Aleyna Tilki, Turkish singer
March 29 – Jireel, Swedish rapper
March 30 – Marius Yo, Japanese singer-songwriter and actor (Sexy Zone)
April 3 – Koba LaD, French rapper
April 9 – Jackie Evancho, American classical crossover singer
April 10 – Surf Mesa, American electronic musician
April 11 – Karina, South Korean singer and dancer (aespa)
April 12 – Manuel Turizo, Colombian singer
April 13 – Khea, Argentine trap singer
April 20 – Klara Hammarström, Swedish singer
April 23 – Jeno, South Korean singer and dancer (NCT)
April 26 – Unique Salonga, Filipino musician and singer-songwriter
April 27 – Be'O, South Korean rapper
April 28 – Victoria De Angelis, Italian bassist (Måneskin)
May 1
9lokkNine, American rapper
Rema, Nigerian rapper and singer-songwriter
May 7 – Eden Alene, Israeli singer
May 18 – Carlie Hanson, American musician and YouTuber
May 20 - Rosa Linn, Armenian singer-songwriter
May 26 – Yeji, South Korean singer and dancer (ITZY)
May 28 – Maisie Peters, English "Emo Girl Pop" singer-songwriter, musician, and YouTuber
June 2 – MC Jottapê, Brazilian singer-songwriter and actor
June 3 – beabadoobee, Filipino-English indie singer-songwriter
June 6 – Haechan, South Korean singer (NCT)
June 8 – Charlotte Lawrence, American singer-songwriter, model
June 13 – Hotboii, American rapper and songwriter
June 16 – Tay-K, American rapper and songwriter
June 29 – Digga D, English rapper songwriter
July 5 – Faouzia, Moroccan-Canadian singer-songwriter and musician
July 7 – HAON, South Korean rapper
July 9 – mxmtoon, Chinese-American singer songwriter, musician and YouTuber
July 14
Mata, Polish rapper and songwriter
Maia Reficco, American singer and actress
July 21 – Lia, South Korean singer (ITZY)
July 23 - Mimi Webb, British singer songwriter
July 28 
Mero, German rapper and songwriter
Audrey Mika, American singer and songwriter. 
August 1
Lil Loaded, American rapper (d. 2021)
Kim Chae-won, South Korean singer (Le Sserafim)
August 3 – Ron Suno, American rapper and songwriter
August 9 – Arlo Parks, English singer-songwriter and poet
August 13 – Jaemin, South Korean singer (NCT)
August 17 – Lil Pump, American rapper, record producer, and songwriter
August 25
 Vincenzo Cantiello, Italian singer
 Nicki Nicole - Argentine singer
 Nick Mira, American record producer and songwriter (Juice Wrld, Lil Uzi Vert, XXXTentacion)
August 26 – ZK, Danish rapper
September 14 – Han Jisung, South Korean rapper, singer-songwriter and record producer (Stray Kids)
September 15 – Fêlix, Australian-Korean rapper (Stray Kids)
September 22 – Seungmin, South Korean singer (Stray Kids)
September 25 – Ikura, American-Japanese singer (Yoasobi)
October 2 – Quadeca, American rapper
October 4 – Lunay, Puerto Rican singer-songwriter
October 8 – Ethan Torchio, Italian drummer and composer (Måneskin)
October 10 – Yangyang, Taiwanese singer (NCT, WayV)
October 13 – Lydia Night, American singer and rhythm guitarist, member of pop rock band The Regrettes
October 21 – Imanbek, Kazakh DJ and record producer
October 22 – Baby Keem, American rapper, songwriter, and record producer (Black Panther (soundtrack), The Lion King: The Gift)
October 23 – Hanna Ferm, Swedish singer
October 27 – Claudia Emmanuela Santoso, Indonesian singer
October 28 – Aydan Calafiore, Australian singer
October 30 – Giselle, Japanese singer-songwriter and rapper (aespa)
October 31 – Willow Smith, American singer-songwriter, rapper, activist, actress and dancer (daughter of Will Smith and Jada Pinkett Smith, sister of Jaden Smith)
November 2 – Junna, Japanese singer
November 8
Jasmine Thompson, English singer
Roy Wang, Chinese singer-songwriter, television host and actor
November 13 – 24kGoldn, American rapper and songwriter
November 22 – Baby Ariel, American singer, actress and social media personality
December 5 – Soobin, South Korean singer (TXT)
December 7 – Niko B, English rapper and musician
December 22 – Joshua Bassett, American singer and actor
November 28 - Jackson Yee, Chinese actor and singer
December 24 – Ethan Bortnick, American pianist, singer-songwriter, record producer and musician
December 26 – Isac Elliot, Finland-Swedish singer, songwriter and dancer
December 28
Larissa Manoela, Brazilian actress, singer and songwriter
Lee Mujin, South Korean folk Singer
December 29 – Eliot Vassamillet, Belgian singer

Deaths
January 2 – Nat Adderley (68), jazz cornet and trumpet player
January 16 – Gene Harris (67), jazz pianist
January 19
Irra Petina (91), operatic contralto
Josh Clayton-Felt (32), singer-songwriter (choriocarcinoma)
January 22 – Carlo Cossutta (67), operatic tenor
February 3 – Alla Rakha (80), tabla player
February 4 – Doris Coley (58), vocalist (the Shirelles)
February 7
Big Punisher (28), rapper (heart attack)
Dave Peverett (56) (Foghat)
February 11 – Lord Kitchener (77), calypsonian
February 12
Screamin' Jay Hawkins (70), U.S. vocal artist
Andy Lewis (33), Australian bass player (The Whitlams) (b. 1967)
Oliver (54), U.S. singer (b. 1945)
February 19 – Marin Goleminov (91), violinist and composer
February 23 – Ofra Haza (42), singer
February 29 – Dennis Danell (38), guitarist (Social Distortion) (brain aneurysm)
March 4 – Walter Dana (97), polka-music promoter
March 5 – Alexander Young (79), operatic tenor
March 7 – Pee Wee King (86), country musician and songwriter (heart attack)
March 20 – Gene "Eugene" Andrusco (38), actor and singer (brain aneurysm)
March 27 – Ian Dury (57), English rock musician (liver cancer)
April 25 – Niels Viggo Bentzon (80), Danish composer
April 27 – Vicki Sue Robinson (45), US disco singer (cancer)
May 2 – Sundar Popo (56), Indo-Trinidadian chutney musician (heart and kidney ailment relating to diabetes)
May 13 – Cesare Valletti (77), operatic tenor
May 20 – Jean-Pierre Rampal (78), flautist
May 31 – Johnnie Taylor (66), singer
June 1 – Tito Puente (77), Afro-Cuban jazz and salsa musician
June 7 – James Moore (44), gospel singer
June 14 – Paul Griffin (62), pianist
June 21 – Alan Hovhaness (89), American composer
June 25 – Wilson Simonal (62), Brazilian singer
July 5 – Lord Woodbine (Harold Adolphus Phillips) (71), calypsonian
July 6
Ľudovít Rajter (93), Slovak composer and conductor
Władysław "Władek" Szpilman (88), Jewish-Polish pianist who survived the Holocaust
July 11 – Jaroslav Filip (51), Slovak musician, actor
July 15 – Paul Young (53), English singer and percussionist of Sad Café and Mike + The Mechanics (heart attack)
July 24 – Oscar Shumsky (83), violinist
July 28 – Jerome Smith (KC and the Sunshine Band)
August 10 – Suzanne Danco (89), operatic soprano
August 13 – Nazia Hassan (34), iconic Pakistani singer (lung cancer)
August 25
Jack Nitzsche (63), arranger, producer, songwriter and composer
Allen Woody (44), bass guitarist
September 12 – Stanley Turrentine (66), jazz saxophonist
September 21 – Bengt Hambraeus (72), composer for organ
September 25 – Tommy Reilly (81), harmonica virtuoso
September 26 – Carl Sigman (91), songwriter
October 1
Robert Allen (73), American pianist and composer (b. 1928)
Cub Koda (51), singer, guitarist and songwriter (Brownsville Station)
October 3 – Benjamin Orr (53), bassist, vocalist of The Cars
October 17 – Joachim Nielsen (36), Norwegian rock singer in Jokke & Valentinerne
October 18 – Julie London (74), US singer and actress
October 21 – Frankie Crocker, radio DJ
October 27 – Winston Grennan (56), Jamaican drummer
October 28 – Carlos Guastavino (78), composer
October 30 – Steve Allen (78), comedian, composer, talk show host, author
November 8
Brian Boydell (83), Irish composer
Dick Morrissey (60), UK tenor saxophonist (cancer)
November 12 – Stanley Turrentine (64), US tenor saxophonist (stroke)
November 16
DJ Screw (29), hip-hop DJ (codeine overdose)
Joe C. (26), rapper
November 30 – Scott Smith (45), bassist (Loverboy) (lost at sea)
December 17 – Harold Rhodes (89), inventor of Rhodes piano
December 18 – Kirsty McColl (41), English singer songwriter (speedboat accident)
December 19
Rob Buck (42), guitarist (10,000 Maniacs) (liver disease)
Milt Hinton (90), jazz double bassist
Pops Staples (85), gospel and R & B musician
December 24 – Nick Massi (65), bass singer in The Four Seasons

Awards
The following artists are inducted into the Rock and Roll Hall of Fame: Eric Clapton, Earth, Wind & Fire, The Lovin' Spoonful, The Moonglows, Bonnie Raitt and James Taylor
Inductees of the GMA Gospel Music Hall of Fame include Shirley Caesar, and The Oak Ridge Boys

Grammy Awards
Grammy Awards of 2000

Country Music Association Awards
2000 Country Music Association Awards

Eurovision Song Contest
Eurovision Song Contest 2000

Mercury Music Prize
The Hour of Bewilderbeast – Badly Drawn Boy wins.

MTV Video Music Awards
2000 MTV Video Music Awards

Charts

Triple J Hottest 100
Triple J Hottest 100, 2000

See also

 2000 in music (UK)
 Record labels established in 2000

References

 
2000-related lists
Music-related lists
Music by year
20th century in music